Gilles Hampartzoumian (born 20 May 1969) is a retired French football defender.

References

1968 births
Living people
French footballers
AS Cannes players
Lille OSC players
Association football defenders
Ligue 1 players